M&T Bank Stadium is a multi-purpose football stadium located in Baltimore, Maryland. It is the home of the Baltimore Ravens of the National Football League (NFL). The stadium is immediately adjacent to Oriole Park at Camden Yards, the home of the Baltimore Orioles.  Often referred to as "Ravens Stadium" or "The Bank", M&T Bank Stadium officially opened in 1998 and has been praised for its fan amenities, ease of access, concessions and other facilities. The listed capacity for M&T Bank Stadium is 70,745.

The stadium was originally known as Ravens Stadium at Camden Yards, until PSINet acquired the naming rights in 1999, naming it PSINet Stadium. It then reverted to Ravens Stadium in 2002 when PSINet filed for bankruptcy. M&T Bank bought the naming rights in 2003 and signed a 15-year, $75 million contract with the Ravens, which was brokered by Team Services, LLC. The naming rights deal for M&T Bank Stadium was renewed for $60M over 10 years in 2014, extending the name through 2027.

History
Ground was broken for the new stadium in mid-1996, shortly after the arrival of the Ravens. The team played its first two years at Memorial Stadium. Although there was some sentiment from Baltimore residents in having the Ravens stay there permanently, it was deemed too old to host an NFL team. (The Orioles moved away from Memorial Stadium after the 1991 season.)

The stadium site was previously the site of the Wm. Knabe & Co. piano factory, which closed during The Great Depression. A sidewalk keyboard mosaic on the southwest corner of the stadium honors the company's legacy.

In 2003, M&T Bank acquired naming rights to the stadium. The bank had recently entered the Baltimore market with its purchase of Allfirst Bank. Two other companies were in the running to be granted naming rights to the stadium; they were reportedly Nextel and CarMax. Following the September 2002 death of Baltimore Colts quarterback Johnny Unitas, public sentiment leaned toward renaming the then-sponsorless stadium after the Baltimore icon. However, the Ravens and the Maryland Stadium Authority held firm in their right to negotiate naming rights fees. In the end, the plaza in front of the main entrance to the Ravens' stadium was named "Unitas Plaza", complete with a bronze statue of the Hall of Famer. The plaza formerly featured large banners, each containing a picture of Unitas in his playing days, flanking the stadium entrance. After 10 years, these were replaced by large metal 19s (Unitas' number) for the 2012 season. In 2014, the Ravens unveiled a new statue of long-time Raven Ray Lewis next to Unitas' statue. The bronze figure depicts Lewis in the final pose of his iconic "squirrel dance", which he would perform before every Ravens home game upon coming on to the field.

Design

The stadium contains five levels, being the lower bowl, club level, 300 suites level, 400 suites level, and the upper bowl. The lower bowl contains 42 rows of seats, split into two sections. The seats below the tunnel entrances are labeled from 1 to 18, while the seats above the tunnels are labeled from 19 to 42, except in sections 123-130, which contain rows 19-35, due to the press box taking up sideline space. On the club level, the rows are labeled from 1 to 13 on the sidelines, and 1 to 17 in the corners where no suites are located. In the upper bowl, the sideline seats are labeled from 1 to 32, while in the upper bowl end zones, the rows range from 1 to 26. Seat widths for the lower and upper bowls of the stadium vary from 19 to 21 inches, due to the curve design of the stadium, while the padded club seats range from 21 to 23 inches respectively.

The venue is served by the Hamburg Street station of the Baltimore Light Rail.

Playing surface

The stadium originally featured a natural grass surface. However, an artificial surface, Sportexe Momentum Turf, was installed for the 2003 season, which in turn was replaced by a new-generation Sportexe Momentum 51 in 2010. On December 4, 2015, the Ravens announced that in 2016 the team will go back to natural grass playing surface.

Tenants

The Ravens are the stadium's primary tenants. On December 7, 2008, an M&T Bank Stadium then-record crowd of 71,438 watched the Baltimore Ravens defeat the Washington Redskins 24-10 on Sunday Night Football, only to be surpassed the next week when the Pittsburgh Steelers defeated the Ravens 13–9 in front of 71,502. On January 15, 2012, a record crowd of 71,547, the largest in Ravens history, was in attendance at the 2011 Divisional Playoff Game in Baltimore against the Houston Texans, which the Ravens won 20–13.

Notable events

College football

In 2000, the stadium hosted the Army–Navy Game for the first time and has subsequently hosted the rivalry game in 2007, 2014, and 2016.

In 2005, the stadium was the site of the first rematch in the Maryland–Navy series known as the "Crab Bowl Classic" in 40 years. The two teams played again at M&T Bank Stadium on September 6, 2010 and Maryland won 17–14.

On October 28, 2006, the stadium held a contest between Notre Dame and Navy in which Notre Dame won 38–14. In 2014, the stadium played host to Ohio State–Navy; Ohio State won 34–17.

In 2013, the annual rivalry between Maryland and West Virginia was held at the stadium.

On October 24, 2015, the stadium hosted a Big Ten match-up between Maryland and Penn State in which Penn State won 31–30.

In 2022, Notre Dame and Navy are set to play once again at the stadium.

High school football
The Maryland Public Secondary Schools Athletic Association (MPSSAA) held the four state football championships for Maryland's public high schools at M&T Bank Stadium until 2016. Two Baltimore high school football rivalry games have been held at the stadium in November. Baltimore City College used to play Baltimore Polytechnic Institute every November, in one of the oldest high school football rivalries in the United States. Every Thanksgiving, Loyola Blakefield and Calvert Hall College also square off in what has now been called for many years as the Turkey Bowl, usually reaching up to 13,000 people in the audience. Both games were once played back-to-back on Thanksgiving Day at Memorial Stadium. However, when City College and Polytechnic joined the MPSSAA before 1994 season, the game was forced to be played in early November, due to MPSSAA rules and playoff schedule.

Soccer

On July 24, 2009, English Premier League club Chelsea F.C. won 2–1 against Italian Serie A team A.C. Milan in the first World Football Challenge at M&T Bank Stadium in front of a crowd of 71,203. On July 28, 2012 the stadium hosted a match between Premier League teams Liverpool and Tottenham Hotspur before 42,723 fans.

The stadium was a venue for the 2013 CONCACAF Gold Cup, drawing a crowd of 70,450 to watch a quarter finals doubleheader between the United States v. El Salvador, and Honduras v. Costa Rica. The 2015 CONCACAF Gold Cup had two quarterfinals games at the stadium: United States v. Cuba and Haiti v. Jamaica, played in front of 37,994 spectators.

Lacrosse
The stadium serves as an alternate venue for the Johns Hopkins University men's lacrosse team, and was the site of the semifinals and final of the NCAA Division I Men's Lacrosse Championship in 2003, 2004, 2007, 2010, 2011, and 2014.  Major League Lacrosse's Baltimore Bayhawks used the stadium as their home during the 2002 season.

Music and entertainment

Popular music festival HFStival appeared at the stadium in 1999 & 2005, as Foo Fighters, Red Hot Chili Peppers, Silverchair, The Mighty Mighty Bosstones, The Offspring, Blink-182, Goo Goo Dolls, Billy Idol, and Coldplay have all played the concert.

Monster Jam was held at the stadium for the first time in 2011, and the stadium has been announced to become a normal stop on the summer tour. Monster Jam returned for the third time on June 8, 2013.

Popular culture
It served as Nextel Stadium, the home field for the fictional Washington Sentinels in the 2000 film The Replacements. The stadium was also supposed to be the location of the football game in the 2002 film The Sum of All Fears and included footage of the presidential motorcade going to the building. However, the stadium used for the aerial shots is the domed Olympic Stadium in Montreal, while the book used Denver as the locale for the attack.

It was featured in "Stadium," a 2013 television public service announcement which was part of the "I Want To Be Recycled" advertising campaign for Keep America Beautiful and the Ad Council. The stadium is partially constructed from post-consumer recycled aluminum.

COVID-19 vaccine
On February 25, 2021, despite COVID-19 pandemic, M&T Bank Stadium became the third mass vaccination site in the state of Maryland, inoculating residents against COVID-19, according to the Johns Hopkins University (JHU). It is a public-private partnership between the Maryland Air National Guard and the University of Maryland Medical System and has the capacity to do up to 6,000-10,000 vaccinations a day, supply notwithstanding.

References

External links

 
M&T Bank Stadium on Google Street View
M&T Bank Stadium Seating Chart

Downtown Baltimore
National Football League venues
Sports venues completed in 1998
Sports venues in Baltimore
American football venues in Maryland
Navy Midshipmen football venues
Lacrosse venues in Maryland
Former Major League Lacrosse venues
NCAA Men's Division I Lacrosse Championship venues
Baltimore Ravens stadiums
1998 establishments in Maryland
CONCACAF Gold Cup stadiums